Peterson may refer to:


People
Peterson (surname)

Places

United States
 Peterson Air Force Base, Colorado
 Peterson, Indiana
 Peterson, Iowa
 Peterson, Minnesota
 Peterson, Utah

Other uses
 Peterson (company), a Norwegian industrial company
 Peterson Electro-Musical Products, a manufacturer of tuners, etc.
 Peterson Field Guides
 Peterson Pipes
 Peterson Quartet, music
 Peterson's algorithm, computer science
 USS Peterson, two US Navy ships of that name

See also
 Justice Peterson (disambiguation)
 Pedersen
 Pederson (disambiguation)
 Petersen
 Peterson Farm (disambiguation)
 Peterson House (disambiguation)
 Pietersen
 Pieterson